Jeremy Bates (born July 8, 1978) is a Canadian/Australian author. He writes suspense and horror fiction, which typically explores the darker side of human nature. His work is rich in atmosphere and sensory details. The novels in his "World's Scariest Places" series are all set in real locations, such as Aokigahara in Japan, The Catacombs in Paris, Helltown in Ohio, and  Island of the Dolls in Mexico. They have been translated into several languages including Russian, Czech, and German among others.

Biography
Bates was born in Toronto. He attended St. Michael's College School, a private, all boys Roman Catholic high school, and The University of Western Ontario in London, Ontario, where he earned a Bachelor of Arts in English Literature and Philosophy. He also holds a graduate teaching diploma from Charles Darwin University in Darwin, Australia. Bates currently lives on the Gold Coast, Australia.

Novels and short story collections
 White Lies (Oceanview Publishing, 2012)
 The Taste of Fear (Ghillinnein Books, 2012)
 Suicide Forest (Ghillinnein Books, 2014)
 Black Canyon (Ghillinnein Books, 2015)
 The Catacombs (Ghillinnein Books, 2015)
 Run (Ghillinnein Books, 2015)
 Helltown (Ghillinnein Books, 2015)
 Rewind (Ghillinnein Books, 2015)
 Neighbors (Ghillinnein Books, 2015) 
 Dark Hearts (Ghillinnein Books, 2015)
 New America: Utopia Calling (Ghillinnein Books, 2015) 
 Six Bullets (Ghillinnein Books, 2016)
 Island of the Dolls (Ghillinnein Books, 2016)
 Box of Bones (Ghillinnein Books, 2016)
 The Mailman (Ghillinnein Books, 2017)
 Re-Roll (Ghillinnein Books, 2018)
 Mountain of the Dead (Ghillinnein Books, 2018)
 Mosquito Man (Ghillinnein Books, 2019)
 The Man from Taured (Ghillinnein Books, 2019)
 The Sleep Experiment (Ghillinnein Books, 2019)

Nominations, awards and contests
 Winner, "Reader Views Literary Awards" Horror Novel Award, 2018-2019, for Mountain of the Dead
 Finalist, "Aurealis Award for Excellence in Speculative Fiction" Horror Novella Award, 2017, for The Mailman
 Finalist, "Australian Horror Writers Association" Shadows Award, 2017, for The Mailman
 Winner, "Foreword INDIES" Horror Book of the Year Award Gold Medal, 2016, for Island of the Dolls
 Finalist, "Next Generation Indie Book Awards" Horror Novel Award, 2017, for Island of the Dolls
 Finalist, "Aurealis Award for Excellence in Speculative Fiction" Horror Novella Award, 2016, for Box of Bones
 Finalist, "Australian Horror Writers Association" Shadows Award, 2016, for Box of Bones
 Winner, "Crime Writers of Canada" Arthur Ellis Award/The Lou Allen Memorial Award, 2016, for Black Canyon
 Winner, "Australian Horror Writers Association" Shadows Award, 2015, for The Catacombs
 Winner, "IPPY (Independent Publisher Book Awards)" Bronze Medal/Horror, 2016, for The Catacombs
 Finalist, "Next Generation Indie Book Awards" Horror Novella Award, 2016, for Black Canyon
 Winner, "Reader Views Literary Award" Global Award, 2014-2015, for Suicide Forest
 Honorable Mention, "Reader Views Literary Award" Mystery/Thriller/Suspense/Horror Award, 2014-2015, for Suicide Forest
 Finalist, "Goodreads" Choice Awards 2015, for Suicide Forest  
 Finalist, "Australian Horror Writers Association" Shadows Award, 2014, for Suicide Forest
 Finalist, "Foreword INDIES" Horror Book of the Year Award, 2014, for Suicide Forest
 Finalist, "Foreword INDIES" Thriller & Suspense Book of the Year Award, 2012, for White Lies

References

External links
 Official webpage

Living people
1978 births
Canadian male novelists
21st-century Canadian novelists
Canadian horror writers
Writers from Toronto
Canadian emigrants to Australia
21st-century Canadian male writers